MS Stena Edda is a passenger and vehicle RoPax ferry operated by Stena Line between Birkenhead and Belfast.

History
The second of the E-Flexer-class ferries, the ship was constructed at the AVIC Weihai Shipyard in China. The ship was floated on 15 April 2019, and delivered to Stena at Weihai on 15 January 2020.

After conducting berthing trials at Belfast Harbour in February 2020, the ship began its maiden commercial voyage on 9 March 2020, completing it the following day.

Stena Edda is a replacement for Stena Lagan. Stena Lagan was transferred to operate between Nynäshamn and Ventspils on the Baltic Sea, following a rebuild and renaming as Stena Scandica.

References

External links

Stena Line: Stena Edda

Ferries of the United Kingdom
Ferries of Northern Ireland
Ferries of England
Edda
2019 ships